Newtown is a suburb of Ashford in Kent, South East England. It was built by the South Eastern Railway company, adjacent to the railway station, and includes extensive workshops known as Ashford railway works. It was originally intended to call the area Alfred Town but it quickly became known as New Town. By 1850, 130 houses had been built for workshop workers. 

High Speed 1 runs past the area.

The area is invariably shown on maps as New Town.

Ashford Green Corridor, a Local Nature Reserve, includes Newtown Green, adjacent to Newtown.

Ashford, Kent